The 2011 Piazza di Siena – CSIO Rome was the 2011 edition of the CSIO Rome, the Italian official show jumping horse show, at the Piazza di Siena in Rome. It was held as CSIO 5*.

The first horse show were held 1922 at the Piazza di Siena, in 1926 it was an international horse show. Since 1928 Rome is the location of the Italian official show jumping horse show (CSIO = Concours de Saut International Officiel). 2011 is the 79th edition of the CSIO Rome.

The 2011 edition of the CSIO Rome was held between May 26, 2011 and May 29, 2011. The main sponsor of the 2011 Piazza di Siena horse show was SNAI.

FEI Nations Cup of Italy 
The 2011 FEI Nations Cup of Italy was part of the 2011 Piazza di Siena horse show. It was the second competition of the 2011 FEI Nations Cup and was held at Friday, May 27, 2011 at 3:55 pm. The competing teams were: Ireland, France, the United States of America, the Netherlands, Denmark, Germany, Great Britain and Belgium. Also an Italian team as host nation had the chance to start in the competition.

The competition was a show jumping competition with two rounds and optionally one jump-off. The height of the fences were up to 1.60 meters. All teams were allowed to start in the second round. The competition is endowed with 200,000 €.

(grey penalties points do not count for the team result)

Grand Prix “Città di Roma” 
The Grand Prix “Città di Roma” was the major competition of the 2011 Piazza di Siena horse show. The sponsor of this competition was Loro Piana. It was held at Sunday, May 29, 2011 at 4:15 pm. 

The competition was a show jumping competition with two rounds, the height of the fences was up to 1.60 meters. It is endowed with 200,000 €.

References

External links 
 official website
 2011 results

Piazza di Siena
CSIO Rome
Piazza di Siena